A list of books and essays about George A. Romero:

Individual films
Dawn of the Dead

Romero